Renato Sáinz (14 December 1899 – 28 December 1982) was a Bolivian footballer who played as a midfielder. During his career he played for The Strongest and made one appearance for the Bolivia national team at the 1930 FIFA World Cup.

Achievements 
First Division - Pre-National Federation Era: 1
 1930

References

External links

Footballers from La Paz
Bolivian footballers
Bolivia international footballers
1930 FIFA World Cup players
The Strongest players
Association football midfielders
1899 births
1982 deaths